Francisco Andres Lucio (born January 26, 1973), better known by his stage name Frankie Biggz, is an American record producer, musician, singer, songwriter, and DJ.

Frankie Biggz's first credit production work was in 1990 on Miguel Tomas (Warner Bros., 1992) for his Latin-R&B singer and brother Miguel Tomas. After further productions and remixes on various 1990s R&B and Latino albums, Frankie Biggz became one of the most influential record producers for both Independent & Major artists.

Before working by himself, he released several Independent albums and remixes with fellow production partners Miguel Tomas (Brother) & Robert Hilliard under the Groovy Soup production group and label, in which the partners would later earn their first Gold Record (RIAA) under the Sony Music Latin Label for the Artist YURI for her record "Nueva Era".

He has collaborated as a record producer with numerous Latino & R&B artists, including Miguel Tomas, Elida y Avante, Stefani, Jay Perez, Adassa, Frankie Negron, Tito Nieves, Anais, WE, Wanessa Camargo, Juanes,& Oscar D'León (which earned him a collective Latin Grammy Award for Best Contemporary Tropical Album for production) . He has also remixed and produced tracks for Mariah Carey, Eminem, 50 Cent, Kanye West, Britney Spears and Christina Aguilera.

Frankie Biggz also produced IreneB's 2009 album Metamorphosis on his label, Rama Music. In December 2009, The Metamorphosis record would earn two 2009 Premios de la Musica Nominations and by 2010, IreneB's 3rd single "Dedicated" would reach number 1 on Spanish Radio (Conectate FM) in Spain and Colombia.

Biography

Early life (1973–1987) 

Francisco Andres Lucio was born on January 26, 1973, in Monroe, Michigan, where he was raised by his parents Alicia & Rogelio Lucio (both Mexican descent) along with his two brothers, Miguel Tomas Lucio (Older) and Eduardo Joseph Lucio (Younger).

Frankie started showing his musicianship at a very early age, playing drums at a college level when he was only nine. It was then when he would start playing drums in his first band, Hit-n-Run, with his brother Miguel Tomas as a lead singer. The band toured around the US as an opening act of bands like Poison, Guns N' Roses & Ratt.

Production Beginnings (1988–1994) 

At the age of 15, Frankie started showing interest in the production aspect of music, making hip hop tracks under the name "TMP" (The Mexican Prince) on a Roland S-50 keyboard. While in high school, and thanks to mentor Eric Morgenson of Studio A in Dearborn Heights, MI ("Ready for the World", "Nena", etc.), Frankie and his brother Miguel Tomas would start a long-term collaboration with different producers and musicians around the world (including production & writing ensemble brothers Mario Resto & Luis Resto, known for their work with Eminem).

Not long after, both brothers would have their first commercial success when Miguel Tomas was signed to Warner Bros. Records and released his first album, Miguel Tomas, which also featured Gospel producer Fred Hammond and hip hop legends Bass Brothers, who would later discover Eminem.

Texas (1994–1995) 

Once Frankie had established his residence in San Antonio, him, Stephanie Lynn and her group High NRG joined forces to begin working on Stephanie's second EMI album release, Ojos Para Ti (1994).

During his short stay in San Antonio Frankie Biggz began receiving recognition as a songwriter, musician, producer and drummer. He worked as a producer on a number of Tejano projects with Capital EMI & Sony Discos, and Stefani's Todo Mi Amor (Sony Music Distribution, 1995), both earning Gold and Platinum records.

As far as his job as a drummer, he was part of the branding irons stable of Capital EMI known as "The Six Pack" crew, along with Selena, Emilio Navara, Grupo Mas, Jay Perez and Ram Herrera. During his tours he shared stage with Latin international artists such as Luis Miguel, Paulina Rubio, Los Tigres del Norte & male vocal group The Barrio Boyzz.

Back to Detroit and Major Record Deal (1996–2006) 

After his decision to come back to Detroit to further his non-Latin success, Frankie Biggz produced & remixed songs by several major artists (officially and unofficially), including Gansta Rhyme Mistro's "The Ghetto", Eminem's  "Without Me (Remix)" & "Renegade (Remix)", Christina Aguilera's "Come on Over (Remix)", 50 Cent's  "In Da Club (Reggaeton Remix)" and Kanye West's "Gold Digger" (Reggaeton Remix)".

During this period, he also was signed to Talent Beach Music/Universal Music as a Hip Hop artist in the group called BNW, eventually releasing the first single & MTV video "Nena" to BNW's LP entitled "The Difference", which he also produced and co-wrote.

Biggz's BNW European tour was slated for November 2006, but the tour was delayed and eventually canceled along with the record deal after BNW front man Wahero suddenly quit the group in late 2007 for personal reasons unknown. It was a commercial & career disappointment. The loss of Wahero deeply affected Frankie Biggz. In a phone interview in late 2007 with 92.5 Kiss FM for a BNW interview, Frankie Biggz said:

Rama Music LLC, Tempo Music Studio and Music Business Secrets (2007–present)

Rama Music LLC 

In the middle of 2007, at a BNW's concert, Frankie Biggz was pleasantly surprised to find there an old friend, Carlos Valderrama, owner of the prestigious house label Rama Music in the 90s (former label for several dance/house artists, such as Shawn Christopher, Ralphi Rosario, Matt Warren and Ridgeway, amongst others). The company had been in existence for over 10 years with distribution deals from Strictly Rhythm and Universal back in the late 1980s and early 1990s, with other partners such as Cesar Rollon Jr. (Imagen Consultants) & Marilyn Santiago (SBS/Sunshine Integrated Solutions).

After a long time wanting to work together, Carlos Valderrama and Frankie Biggz started brainstorming about the possibility to revamp Rama Music with the release of Spaniard R&B singer IreneB's debut LP "Metamorphosis".

By the end of 2007, Frankie moved to Orlando, FL. (where Carlos Valderrama was established) and became a full partner in the Rama Music record label, as well as opening a recording studio, Tempo Music Studios under the Tempo USA, LLC along with Carlos Valderrama and Spaniard R&B artist IreneB (Irene Bauza)

In the almost three years that Rama Music has been re-activated they have signed two artists, IreneB (that release her English debut album, "Metamorphosis", in 2009) & Latino rapper GuilloMan.

In early 2010, Rama Music LLC launches a digital distribution company Rama Distribution along with Tempo USA and Cool Tempo Publishing with his business partner Carlos Valderrama. On October 31, 2010, Rama Music LLC announces the acquisition of 51,000 song titles in digital circulation throughout the world territories making Rama Distribution an independent power house through digital media.

At the beginning of 2011 in his special live broadcast of his birthday party, he announced that he's currently recording IreneB's second record and he's already started working in his son Marcus "Romantic" Lucio's first record.

Tempo Recording Studios (2007–2009) 

At the end of 2007, Frankie Biggz and his partner Carlos Valderrama, as well as artist IreneB, built their first recording studio, Tempo Recording Studios, in Deltona, FL, that Biggz & IreneB used to record half of IreneB's first English record,"Metamorphosis".
In the middle of 2008 they moved to a bigger location in DeLand, FL, where the stayed for about a year and half.
The studios were conceived and developed by Frankie Biggz & Carlos Valderrama and managed by Carlos Valderrama.

Music Business Secrets (2010–2011) 
In mid-August 2010 Frankie Biggz & Darren Darby (brother of 90s R&B superstar Terence Trent D'Arby) decided to launch their online show, Music Business Secrets, an online Q&A that would expose and educate young upcoming producers, artists & publishers. The show also reviews musical work by different musical talent, that they can submit via MusicXray, where he was already doing private critique and consulting for artists and producers.
The show can still be seen in the recorded format at Frankie Biggz's blog or YouTube channel.

Other Achievements and Collaborations

Jeff Lorber: Now Is The Time (2010) 
In late 2008, Frankie Biggz contacted EMI for a sample clearance of Jeff Lorber's "Rain Dance" (known for his use by Lil' Kim in her hit "Crush", featuring Lil Cesar & Notorious B.I.G.), that he had used for IreneB's song "I Wanna Fly" (included in "Metamorphosis"). Not long after, legendary jazz keyboard player Jeff Lorber reached out to IreneB & Frankie Biggz to congratulate them for their work. After several conversations between the three, Jeff Lorber and producer Bobby Colomby invited them to participate in his upcoming LP Now Is the Time.
Frankie Biggz co-wrote with IreneB & Jeff Lorber four songs: "Rain Dance/Wanna Fly", "Sugar Free", "Water Sign" & "Curtains/Before We Go", that IreneB performed in the album.
On June 1, 2010, "Now Is The Time" was released under Heads Up International record label. Produced by Bobby Colomby and Jeff Lorber and with guest appearances by Dave Weckl, Vinnie Colaiuta, Paul Jackson, Jr., Eric Marienthal & Jimmy Haslip. The album reached #8 on the Billboard Jazz Album charts.
On December 1, 2010, "Now Is The Time" was nominated for a Grammy in the Best Contemporary Jazz Album category.

Future Music Forum (2010) 
On September 30, 2010, Frankie Biggz was invited to be a keynote speaker, along with his partners Carlos Valderrama & IreneB, in the Future Music Forum conference, held in Barcelona, Spain. They talked about the music industry nowadays, specially dealing with digital distribution and other subjects from the artist, producer & label's point of view.

Personal life 
Frankie Biggz has been married and divorced twice, he has one son from a previous relationship: Marcus "Romantic" Lucio (20). Frankie is engaged to Spaniard R&B artist IreneB, that he met in 2006. They reside between Orlando, FL. & Barcelona, Spain.

References 

1973 births
American dance musicians
American male singers
American multi-instrumentalists
Latin Grammy Award winners
Hip hop record producers
Midwest hip hop musicians
Living people
Singers from Michigan
Rappers from Michigan
Record producers from Michigan
People from Monroe, Michigan
21st-century American rappers
21st-century American male musicians
American musicians of Mexican descent